Fritz Joachim Weyl (February 19, 1915 – July 20, 1977) was born in Zurich, Switzerland.  Today Weyl is regarded as a renowned mathematician.  During his lifetime he taught at many universities, significantly contributed to research in mathematics and came to be very well respected.  One of the universities he taught at was the George Washington University (GW or GWU), in Washington, D.C.

Early life 
Fritz was the son of another famous mathematician named Hermann Weyl and writer and translator Helene Weyl.  Fritz received his Bachelor of Arts degree from Swarthmore College, which is located in Pennsylvania, in 1935.  Weyl then went on to obtain a Master's degree in 1937 from Princeton University, in New Jersey.  Finally Weyl was awarded a PhD, also by Princeton University in 1939 for his work in the field of mathematics.  His PhD dissertation at Princeton was entitled "Analytic Curves" and is twenty-five pages in length.  Salomon Bochner served as his dissertation advisor and oversaw his research in the area while Weyl was studying at Princeton.  Bochner too is well known in the math world.  He is a native of Germany and received his PhD in 1921 from the University of Berlin.  His dissertation advisor was Erhard Schmidt.  While at Princeton, Bochner advised many students who went on to achieve much academic success in their own right.

Career 
Professor Weyl taught at a number of different universities during his life.  These include a stay at the University of Illinois, the University of Maryland, College Park, Indiana University, and the George Washington University.  In addition to teaching, Weyl was employed as a research analyst by the U.S. government for a period of time.  After his stay there he went on to serve as the Dean of Science and Mathematics at Hunter College in New York City.

Weyl served as the President of the Society for Industrial and Applied Mathematics (SIAM) 1960-1961.

Time at George Washington University 
Weyl joined the department of mathematics at GW around 1946.  The President of the University at the time was Cloyd Heck Marvin.  During this time period, GW is described as having been particularly vibrant in student life.  As of 1945, the university offered 387 courses to almost 13,000 wartime students.  These programs were primarily conducted under a contract between GW and the U.S Office of Education for Engineering, Science and Management War Training.  The establishment of this program was seen as necessary and was inherently due to the U.S.'s heavy involvement in World War II at the time.  Many American (and global) universities were affected by the war.  GW was no exception but given GW's strategic location in metropolitan D.C., it would be appropriate to conclude that more emphasis was paid to developing programs here than in less vital locations in other parts of the country.  An estimated 7,000 GW graduates served in the armed forces.

The math department at GW has a long history and tradition.  In 1935 the department of statistics was the first of its kind in a college of arts and sciences in the U.S.  In 1946, during Professor Weyl's time here, a theoretical physics conference was held at GW.  It was put on in a joint effort by the university and the Carnegie Institution of Washington.  At the conference theoretical physicists met with biologists to conduct a study of living processes, Dr. Weyl was in attendance.  The conference held in 1946 served as the postwar resumption of a conference series held annually which began in 1934.  Sources state that these meetings were not standard academic gatherings, in the sense that a small number of active researchers gathered for a discussion of problems, and to pose questions to spark continued work and activity in the immediate years to come.  Conversely standard conferences, the bulletin reported, would merely recycle results previously obtained.

James Henry Taylor was a mathematics professor at GW from 1929 to 1958 and then professor emeritus until his death in 1972.  During Dr. Weyl's time here, he and Dr. Taylor worked together in the GW math department.  During 1946 the department is noted as having taught advanced analytics, geometry, and tensor analysis.  Some time shortly after 1946 however the department developed thirty-four additional courses in everything from collegiate algebra to analytic geometry and plane trigonometry.  Today the university awards a "grand math prize" in Taylor's honor. Another famous professor in the GW math department with Weyl in 1946 was Florence Marie Mears, who taught at GW from 1929 to 1955.  The year of 1946 was particularly renowned in the GW mathematics department for having so many famous mathematicians there at once.

Other work 
Both Fritz and his father Hermann published much work on mathematical research.  Most of Hermann's published work is not in English however.  In 1970s, Constance Reid wrote books about David Hilbert and Richard Courant where Hermann Weyl is mentioned many times and his son once, on p. 381 in the volume about Courant.  In 1949, Hermann published a book entitled Philosophy of Mathematics and Natural Science.  This work was originally published by Princeton University Press.  Fritz and Hermann published a book together called Meromorphic Functions and Analytic Curves.  This work is believed to be based on notes from a course given at the Institute for Advanced Study during the first term of 1942–1943.  While Fritz was working for the U.S. government he complied what is known as Research in the service of national purpose; proceedings of the Office of Naval Research Vicennial Convocation, in 1966.  This work is available at the National Museum of American History located at the Smithsonian.  Also many researchers have cited Weyl's work when conducting their own.  For example his work is cited as a reference in the publication The Philosophical Review.

When Dr. Fritz Weyl died on July 20, 1977 the mathematics community considered the loss to be devastating.  Shortly thereafter on October 8, 1977 the Board of Trustees for the Society for Industrial and Applied Mathematics (SIAM) issued a memoriam.  In part it read: "...in warm recognition of his enduring vision for both the beauties and the practicalities of applied mathematics...the members and officers of SIAM and SIMS offer their heartfelt tribute".

References

20th-century Swiss mathematicians
Presidents of Hunter College
Presidents of the Society for Industrial and Applied Mathematics
1915 births
1977 deaths
Swiss emigrants to the United States
20th-century American academics